Castle Bromwich was a rural district in Warwickshire, England from 1894 to 1912.

It was created by the Local Government Act 1894 based on the Aston rural sanitary district.  It consisted of the parishes of Castle Bromwich, Curdworth, Minworth, Water Orton and Wishaw.  The district was abolished in 1912, and the parishes added to the Meriden Rural District.

References
https://web.archive.org/web/20071001044125/http://www.visionofbritain.org.uk/relationships.jsp?u_id=10106631

History of Warwickshire
Districts of England created by the Local Government Act 1894
Rural districts of England